On April 22, 2019, a 6.1 magnitude earthquake struck the island of Luzon in the Philippines, leaving at least 18 dead, three missing and injuring at least 256 others. Despite the fact that the epicenter was in Zambales, most of the damage to infrastructure occurred in the neighboring province of Pampanga, which suffered damage to 29 buildings and structures.

Earthquake 

The Philippine Institute of Volcanology and Seismology (PHIVOLCS) initially reported an earthquake of magnitude 5.7 striking at 17:11 PST with an epicenter two kilometers N 28° E of Castillejos, Zambales. The report was later revised to an earthquake of magnitude 6.1 with epicenter 18 kilometers N 58° E of Castillejos.

The fault from which the earthquake originated is yet to be determined, with geologists focusing on two nearby fault systems, the Iba Fault and the East Zambales Fault, trying to ascertain the source of the earthquake. 

PHIVOLCS stated that the volcano Mount Pinatubo, located near the earthquake's epicenter, has not shown any "anomalous activity". Pinatubo is known for its major eruption in 1991, which may have been related to a major 7.7 magnitude earthquake in 1990. PHIVOLCS added that the earthquake could not trigger an eruption of Pinatubo, explaining that the volcano's magma supply has not sufficiently replenished since 1991 to allow for an eruption.

Casualties 
As of April 29, 2019, the National Disaster Risk Reduction and Management Council confirmed 18 deaths, 3 people missing and 256 injuries. Of the 18 reported dead, five died in the collapsed four-storey Chuzon Supermarket in the municipality of Porac, seven elsewhere in the town, two in Lubao, one in Angeles City, and one in San Marcelino, Zambales.

Damage and effects 

State seismologists said that Zambales had been spared from the earthquake destruction, despite the location of the epicenter being there, although the reports of fatalities and the damage have yet to be received by the local authorities. The neighboring province of Pampanga suffered damage to 29 structures/buildings and was the area most affected by the earthquake, due to the province sitting on soft sediment and alluvial soil.

There have been at least 421 aftershocks reported but only 8 were felt.

Government Infrastructures 
According to Pampanga governor Lilia Pineda, several structures in the province were damaged by the quake, including Chuzon Supermarket, a 4-story supermarket in Porac, The Bataan-Pampanga boundary arch collapsed, and the control tower and passenger's terminal of Clark International Airport damaged.  In Central Luzon, 5 dams were damaged and in need of immediate repairs, with an estimated cost of 20 million pesos, according to the National Irrigation Administration (NIA).

Commercial Buildings 
On April 25, the Philippine National Police (PNP) released the CCTV footage of the collapsed Chuzon Supermarket; the video shows the actual collapse of the second floor of the building just 10 seconds after the earthquake. Due to the collapse of the 4-story Chuzon Supermarket, the Department of the Interior and Local Government had to suspend all business permits of Chuzon Supermarket and its branches, as well as to conduct an investigation regarding the collapse of the 4-storey commercial establishment, which was built 4 years ago. Some branches resumed operations in 2020.

Power 

Power outages were reported in the provinces of Bataan, La Union, Pampanga and Pangasinan. They were also experienced in parts of Quezon, Batangas, Camarines Sur and Sorsogon, where power supply has since been restored. The National Grid Corporation of the Philippines (NGCP) issued an alert level at yellow status on the Luzon grid after the initial earthquake.

Schools, colleges and universities 
Following the earthquake, classes in all levels were suspended. Numerous schools, universities and colleges that were affected by the earthquake announced class suspension for April 23 and 24. The Department of Education ordered the thorough inspection of school buildings and facilities in the affected areas. A 10-story building of Emilio Aguinaldo College along United Nations Avenue in Manila was reported to have tilted and leaned onto the adjacent building, causing its fiberglass terrace to hit the other building. Soil liquefaction underneath the building was seen as probable causes. One lane of United Nations Avenue was closed to vehicular traffic to ensure the safety of motorists. An assessment team composed of private and local government structural engineers stated that the building's structural integrity remains intact.

Churches 
Several churches in Pampanga were damaged or collapsed. The belfry of the 17th-century San Agustin Church in Lubao was partly damaged, while the bell tower of the 19th-century Santa Catalina de Alejandria Church in Porac collapsed. The Holy Rosary Parish Church in Angeles City sustained damages on the church's ceiling, pillars and windows.

Transport 
Train services in Metro Manila were halted followed by an extensive inspection. All lines were closed for the rest of the day. Train services were expected to resume when the inspection results came out with the findings that the railway system sustained no damage. A crack on the girder was reported at the Line 2 Recto Station, but it came from an existing damage and was not earthquake related according to the Department of Transportation (DOTr). It was also superficial in nature.

Rescue efforts 
The authorities began the search and rescue operations for the survivors in the collapsed supermarket in Porac; however, the operation was suspended when a 4.5-magnitude aftershock hit the neighboring town in Castillejos, Zambales on April 24 at 2:02am (PST).

See also 

List of earthquakes in 2019
List of earthquakes in the Philippines
1968 Casiguran earthquake
1990 Luzon earthquake
1999 Luzon earthquake
2019 Visayas earthquake – a similar, but unrelated, earthquake that occurred less than a day later
Manila Trench
Philippine Trench

References

External links

2019 earthquakes
2019 disasters in the Philippines
Earthquakes in the Philippines
April 2019 events in the Philippines
2019 in the Philippines
Earthquake
Earthquake